Silver Hills is an unincorporated community in Floyd County, Indiana, in the United States.

Name
Silver Hills shares its name with a set of hills. The hills are known locally as "the knobs" and Silver Hills appears to be a translation of the Native American name.

References

Unincorporated communities in Floyd County, Indiana
Unincorporated communities in Indiana